Robert College International Model United Nations (RCIMUN) is a THIMUN-affiliated Model United Nations (MUN) conference. The 4-day MUN conference is held at the Robert College campus in Beşiktaş, İstanbul.

History 
RCIMUN has been held annually since 2006, except in 2020 during the COVID-19 pandemic. The latest RCIMUN, held in 2022, had over 600 participants. It now includes its own historical committee, the Robert College Specialized Agencies (RCSA) which is one of the few entirely historical-oriented MUN conferences. It is the only conference in Turkey that has a special committee called the International Criminal Court (ICC), a simulation of the real ICC located in The Hague.

References

Model United Nations
Education in Istanbul